Ronson Vincent, also known as George Vincent,  is a Malayalam television actor. Ronsons family hails from Calicut India.

He made his small screen debut with Bharya, portraying the role of Nandan in Asianet.

Career

Ronson Vincent started his career as a model for popular brands. He made his silver screen debut with the Telugu film Manasara... directed by Ravi Babu. He portrayed the character of an IT professional, a man with shades of grey. Vincent received the Bharata Muni award for the best villain for the film Manasara...  Vincent landed in Malayalam entertainment world with ‘'Study Tour Batch 162’' helmed by Thomas Benjamin.

He entered the small screen with the soap opera Bharya aired in Asianet. He gives life to Nandan, son of Prof. Vishwanatha Menon and Jayapradha teacher. Bharya tells the tale of family residing in Vrindavanam. Aleena Padikkal portrays the role of Nayana, Nandan's wife.

Television 
All programs are serials, unless otherwise noted.

Awards and nominations

Filmography

References

External links 
 
 Official Website

Living people
Male actors from Kozhikode
Male actors in Telugu cinema
Indian male film actors
Male actors in Malayalam television
Indian male television actors
Male actors in Malayalam cinema
21st-century Indian male actors
1989 births
Bigg Boss Malayalam contestants